Sphegina javana is a species of hoverfly in the family Syrphidae.

Distribution
Java.

References

Eristalinae
Insects described in 1914
Taxa named by Johannes C. H. de Meijere
Diptera of Asia